Association Sportive Saint-Michel Elgeco Plus is a football (soccer) club from Madagascar based in Analamanga.

Achievements
THB Champions League : 2
 1971, 1978.

Coupe de Madagascar: 4
 1980, 2013, 2014, 2018.

Super Coupe de Madagascar : 0

Performance in CAF competitions
CAF Confederation Cup: 2 appearances
2014 - Preliminary Round
2015 - Preliminary Round

References

External links
Team profile - The Biggest Football Archive of the World

Football clubs in Madagascar